= Steyl bear =

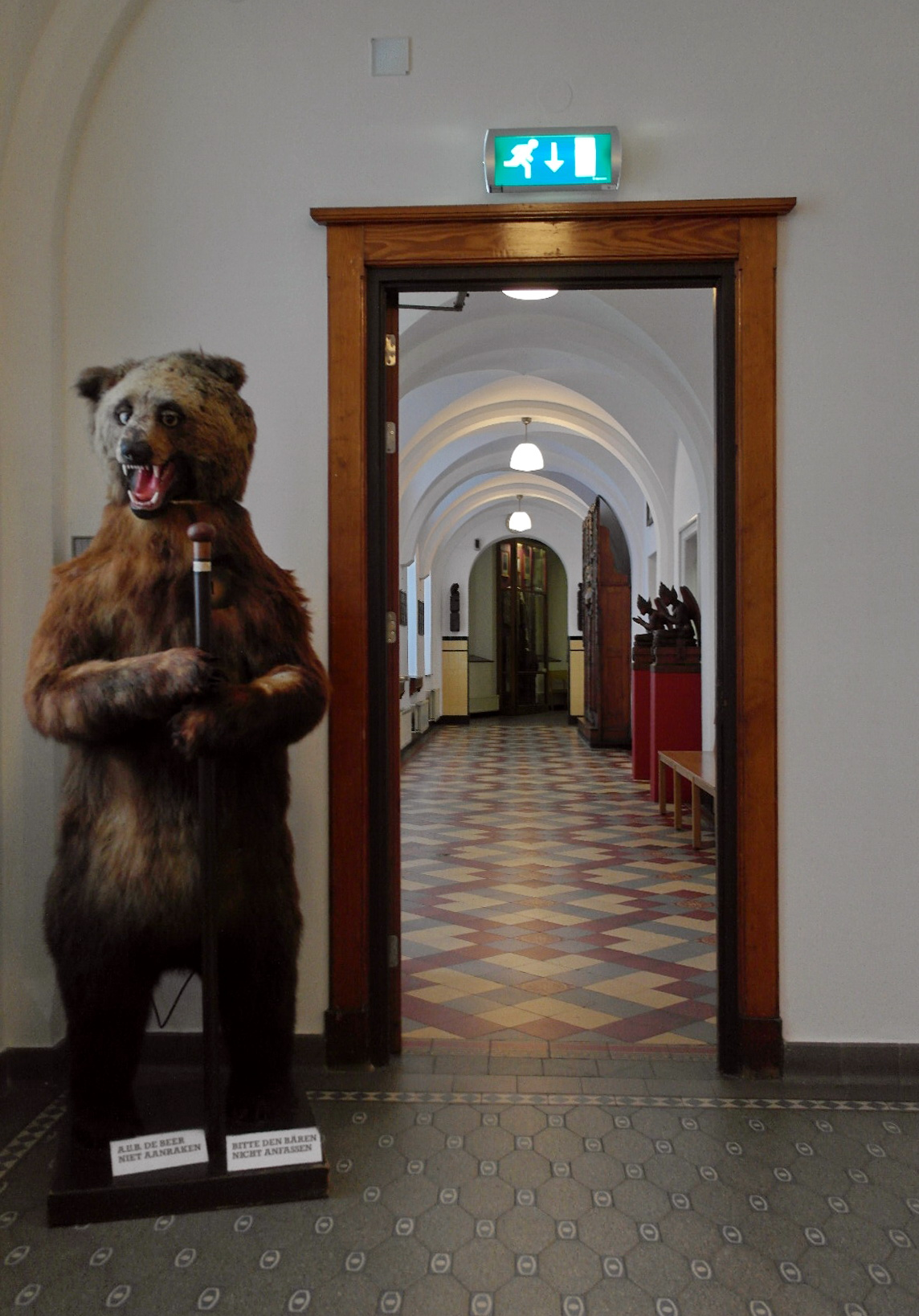
- Beer Steyl at Missiemuseum Steyl
- Type: Mechanical taxidermy exhibit
- Material: Taxidermied bear, mechanical components
- Created: Pre-1931
- Present location: Missiemuseum Steyl, Netherlands

Steyl bear (In Dutch: Beer Steyl) is a mechanical bear exhibited at the Missiemuseum Steyl, the Netherlands. Since 1931, the bear has stood as a central attraction at the museum, where visitors traditionally insert a coin to activate its antique mechanism.

== History and description ==
The mechanical bear has been part of the Missiemuseum collection for over 90 years. Despite not being internationally famous, it is highly recognized within the region. Its internal mechanism operates upon inserting a coin, animating the mounted bear for viewers. The bear is believed to have originated from Russia.

Paul Voogt, the museum’s curator, has described the bear as a long-standing symbol of the museum. Until recently, it was thought to be one of a kind. However, another nearly identical bear—referred to as its "twin brother"—was discovered in a missionary monastery in Sankt Wedel, Germany, which is closing. The museum in Steyl was granted custody of this second bear.

The bear was completely restored in 2018.

== Twin bear and future plans ==
The twin bear, which is over 100 years old, is as of 2025 undergoing inspection and restoration in Belfeld. Although its coin mechanism differs slightly from the original, it appears to be in good condition.

Once fully restored, the bear will first be displayed at the Drents Museum in Assen for a temporary exhibition, curated by a departing colleague of Voogt. After its appearance in Assen, the second bear will be permanently relocated to the Missiemuseum in Steyl.

According to the labeling from Germany, the bear originates from the Carpathian Mountains—a region stretching across Slovakia, Poland, Romania, and Ukraine. This suggests that the museum will soon house one bear from Russia and another potentially from Ukraine or Romania.

== Significance ==
The discovery and arrival of the "twin" bear has generated excitement among museum staff and the local community, highlighting the cultural and historical value of these rare mechanical exhibits.
